Spot-nosed monkey refers to two species in the genus Cercopithecus (guenons):
Greater spot-nosed monkey (Cercopithecus nictitans)
Lesser spot-nosed monkey (Cercopithecus petaurista)

Animal common name disambiguation pages